Beer money is the nickname for an allowance given to soldiers in the British Army.

Beer Money may also refer to:

Beer Money, a song by country artist Kip Moore
Beer Money!, a sports game show set in New York
Beer Money, Inc., a professional wrestling tag team
Beer Money, an expansion and sequel to the game Lunch Money
Beer Money, a 2001 comedy science-fiction film.

See also 

 Beer monopolies